Solanki is a surname and given name. Notable people with the name include:

Surname
 Arvind Solanki, Indian cricketer
 Bharatsinh Madhavsinh Solanki, politician and President of Gujarat Pradesh Congress Committee
 Bhupendrasinh Prabhatsinh Solanki, member of the 14th Lok Sabha of India
 Bimla Singh Solanki, Indian politician and a member of the 16th Legislative Assembly of India
 Bindya Solanki, British actress
 Dharam Dev Solanki, Indian politician from Bhartiya Janata Party
 Dinu Solanki, Indian politician from Bhartiya Janata Party and a former member of the Delhi Legislative Assembly
 Hira Solanki, Member of Legislative assembly from Rajula constituency in Gujarat
 Hitesh Solanki, Indian first-class cricketer
 Irfan Solanki, Indian politician from Uttar Pradesh
 Kaptan Singh Solanki, Indian politician and Governor of Haryana
 Kirit Premjibhai Solanki, Indian politician and medical practitioner
 Laljibhai Solanki, Member of Legislative assembly from Jamnagar Rural constituency in Gujarat
 Madhav Singh Solanki, Indian National Congress party politician and former External Affairs minister
 Makhansingh Solanki, Indian politician from Bhartiya Janata Party
 Purshottam Solanki, Indian politician from Bhartiya Janata Party and minister
 Rakesh Solanki, Indian cricketer
 Sami Solanki, Pakistan-born director of the Max Planck Institute for Solar System Research
 Shiv Bhanu Singh Solanki, Indian National Congress politician from Madhya Pradesh
 Sneha Solanki, British artist and educator
 Somchandbhai Solanki, Indian politician and Member of the Parliament
 Varjesh Solanki, Indian Marathi poet from Mumbai
 Vikram Solanki, India-born English cricketer

Given name
 Solanki Roy, Indian actress

See also
 Solanki (disambiguation)

Indian surnames